The 1987 Taça de Portugal Final was the final match of the 1986–87 Taça de Portugal, the 47th season of the Taça de Portugal, the premier Portuguese football cup competition organized by the Portuguese Football Federation (FPF). The match was played on 7 June 1987 at the Estádio Nacional in Oeiras, and opposed two Primeira Liga sides: Benfica and Sporting CP. Benfica defeated Sporting CP 2–1 to claim the Taça de Portugal for a twenty first time.

In Portugal, the final was televised live on RTP. As Benfica claimed both league and cup double in the same season, cup runners-up Sporting CP faced their cup final opponents in the 1987 Supertaça Cândido de Oliveira.

Match

Details

References

1987
1986–87 in Portuguese football
S.L. Benfica matches
Sporting CP matches